Dimitar Petrov Ludzhev (born 27 March 1950) is a Bulgarian politician and economist who served as vice-Prime Minister in the Dimitar Popov government between 1990 and 1991 and Minister of Defence in the Filip Dimitrov cabinet from 1991 to 1992.

Life
Ludzhev was born in Burgas and graduated with a degree in political economy and sociology from the UNWE, which was prior to 1990 known as "Karl Marx" Higher Institute of Economics (Bulgarian: Висш икономически институт "Карл Маркс"). He has also worked for the history institute of the Bulgarian Academy of Sciences.

Between 1990 and 1992, Ludzhev was a member of the UDF, but after that founded his own parties and political coalitions such as the Union for National Salvation (Bulgarian: Обединение за национално спасение).

Ludzhev holds a doctorate in the field of history and is the author of numerous scientific publications. He has made specializations in Poland and the United States.

References 

Books

1950 births
Living people
Politicians from Burgas
Government ministers of Bulgaria
Union of Democratic Forces (Bulgaria) politicians
University of National and World Economy alumni
Karl Marx Higher Institute of Economics alumni
Defence ministers of Bulgaria